Canace nascia is a European species of Canacidae.

Distribution

Cape Verde Islands, Senegal, England, France, Ireland, Spain, Egypt, Azores, Canary Islands and Madeira Islands.

References

Canacidae
Diptera of Europe
Taxa named by Alexander Henry Haliday
Diptera of Africa
Insects described in 1839